Nantianping Township is a rural township in Ningxiang County, Changsha City, Hunan Province, China. Nantianping township merged to Batang town on November 19, 2015.

Administrative division
The township is divided into ten villages: Zhushan Village, Yantian Village, Yiping Village, Xifu Village, Hengtian Village, Nanfentang Village, Junli Village, Yangxi Village, Hongtaoshan Village and Nantianping Village.

Geography
The Wu River, a tributary of the Wei River, flows through the town.

Economy
The region abounds with iron.

Culture
Huaguxi is the most influence local theatrical syle.

References

Historic towns and townships of Ningxiang